God Told Me To is a 1976 film.

God Told Me To may also refer to:
 God Told Me To (album), an album by John 5
 "God Told Me To" (song), a single by Paul Kelly